A general election was held in the U.S. state of Vermont on November 6, 2018. All of Vermont's executive officers were up for election as well as Vermont's Class I Senate seat and at-large seat in the United States House of Representatives. Primary elections were held on August 14, 2018.

United States Senate

Independent incumbent Bernie Sanders was elected to a third term.

United States House of Representatives

Democratic incumbent Peter Welch was elected to a seventh term.

Governor

Incumbent Republican Phil Scott was elected to a second term.

Lieutenant Governor

Incumbent Progressive/Democratic Lieutenant Governor Dave Zuckerman (since 2017) was elected to a second term.

Democratic primary
Zuckerman was unopposed in the Democratic primary.

Results

Republican primary
House Republican Minority Leader Don H. Turner Jr. ran uncontested in the Republican primary.

Results

Progressive primary
Zuckerman also again ran as a write-in candidate in the Progressive primary and was unopposed.

Results

Liberty Union nomination
Murray Ngoima, candidate for Treasurer in 2010, 2014, and 2016, ran unopposed for the Liberty Union State Committee's nomination for Lieutenant Governor.

General election

Polling

Results

Secretary of State

Incumbent Democratic Secretary of State Jim Condos (since 2011) was elected to a fifth term.

Democratic primary
Condos was unopposed in the Democratic primary.

Results

Republican primary
H. Brooke Paige, a perennial candidate, was unopposed in the Republican primary. Paige also ran in and won the Republican primary for U.S. Senate, U.S. House, Attorney General, Treasurer and Auditor of Accounts.

Results

Liberty Union nomination
Mary Alice Herbert, candidate for Secretary of State in 2016, ran unopposed for the Liberty Union State Committee's nomination for Secretary of State.

General election
Governing magazine projected the race as "safe Democratic".

Treasurer

Incumbent Democratic Treasurer Beth Pearce (since 2011) was elected to a fifth term.

Democratic primary
Pearce was unopposed in the Democratic primary.

Results

Republican primary
H. Brooke Paige, a perennial candidate, was unopposed in the Republican primary. Paige also ran in and won the Republican primary for U.S. Senate, U.S. House, Attorney General, Secretary of State and State Auditor of Accounts.

Results

Post-primary
Paige withdrew August 24, allowing the state Republican party to name a replacement. On August 29, the Vermont Republican Party selected Rick Morton, the current state party treasurer.

General election

Attorney General
Incumbent Democratic Attorney General T. J. Donovan (since 2017) was elected to a second term.

Democratic primary
Donovan was unopposed in the Democratic primary.

Results

Republican primary
H. Brooke Paige, a perennial candidate, was unopposed in the Republican primary. Paige also ran in and won the Republican primary for U.S. Senate, U.S. House, Secretary of State, State Treasurer and State Auditor of Accounts.

Results

Post primary
Paige withdrew August 24, allowing the state Republican party to name a replacement. On August 29, the Vermont Republican Party selected State Representative Janssen Willhoit (Caledonia-3) as their Attorney General nominee.

Liberty Union nomination
Rosemarie Jackowski, candidate for Attorney General in 2016, ran unopposed for the Liberty Union State Committee's nomination for Attorney General.

General election

Auditor of Accounts
Incumbent Democratic/Progressive Auditor Doug Hoffer (since 2013) was elected to a fourth term.

Democratic primary
Hoffer was unopposed in the Democratic primary.

Results

Republican primary
H. Brooke Paige, a perennial candidate, was unopposed in the Republican primary. Paige also ran in and won the Republican primary for U.S. Senate, U.S. House, Attorney General, Secretary of State and State Treasurer.

Results

Post-primary
Paige withdrew August 24, allowing the state Republican party to name a replacement. On August 29, the Vermont Republican Party selected Rick Kenyon, a tax preparer from Brattleboro.

Progressive primary
Hoffer also again ran as a write-in candidate in the Progressive primary and was unopposed.

Results

Liberty Union nomination
Marina Brown, candidate for Auditor in 2016, ran unopposed for the Liberty Union State Committee's nomination for Auditor.

General election

State Legislature
All 30 seats in the Vermont Senate and all 150 seats of the Vermont House of Representatives were up for election. The balance of political power before the elections for each chamber was:

Senate

House of Representatives

And the results of the elections for both chambers was:

County offices
All county level offices were up for election. The balance of political power before and after the elections for each office was:

Before

Addison County

After

Addison County

Bennington County

Bennington County

Caledonia County

Caledonia County

Chittenden County

Chittenden County

Essex County

Essex County

Franklin County

Franklin County

Grand Isle County

Grand Isle County

Lamoille County

Lamoille County

Orange County

Orange County

Orleans County

Orleans County

Rutland County

Rutland County

Washington County

Washington County

Windham County

Windham County

Windsor County

Windsor County

Notes

References

External links
Candidates at Vote Smart 
Candidates at Ballotpedia
Campaign finance at OpenSecrets

Official Lieutenant Governor campaign websites
Don Turner Jr. (R) for Lt. Governor 
David Zuckerman (P/D) for Lt. Governor

Official Attorney General campaign websites
T.J. Donovan (D) for Attorney General
Janssen Willhoit (R) for Attorney General

Official Auditor of Accounts campaign websites
Doug Hoffer (D/P) for Auditor

 
Vermont